Aserkhovo is a rural locality (a settlement) and the administrative center of Aserkhovskoye Rural Settlement, Sobinsky District, Vladimir Oblast, Russia. The population was 788 as of 2010. There are 16 streets.

Geography 
Aserkhovo is located 20 km southeast of Sobinka (the district's administrative centre) by road. Voshilovo is the nearest rural locality.

References 

Rural localities in Sobinsky District